Andrew Sherk (born April 15, 1992) is an American luger. He competed in the men's doubles event at the 2018 Winter Olympics.

References

External links
 

1992 births
Living people
American male lugers
Olympic lugers of the United States
Lugers at the 2018 Winter Olympics
Place of birth missing (living people)